"Underestimated" is a 2008 song recorded by American singer Jennifer Paige. The song was written by Paige and Ries and produced by Peter Ries. The song was released on May 5, 2008, as the second single from her third album, Best Kept Secret. "Underestimated" reached #26 in Nederlands. The remix of Peter Ries isn't included in the album.

Track listing
 Underestimated (Peter Ries Radio Remix) — 3:13
 Underestimated (Original Version) — 3:48

Charts 
The song reached number 26 in Nederlands.

References

2008 singles
Jennifer Paige songs
2008 songs
Songs written by Peter Ries